Constantia is an affluent suburb of Cape Town, South Africa, situated about 15 kilometres south of the centre of Cape Town. It is considered to be one of the most prestigious suburbs in South Africa. The Constantia Valley lies to the east of and at the foot of the Constantiaberg mountain. Constantia Nek is a low pass linking to Hout Bay in the west. Constantia is a beautiful family orientated place for families to grow, with the leafy canopies of trees and top schools.

History
Constantia is one of the oldest townships of Cape Town and is famed for its wine. The estate of Groot Constantia (Great Constantia) was established in 1685 by the Dutch Colonial Governor of Cape Town, Simon van der Stel. Other notable wine farms in the area include the oldest estate, Steenberg (Mountain of Stone), established in 1682, Buitenverwachting (Beyond Expectations), Klein Constantia (Small Constantia) and Constantia Uitsig (View of Constantia). Before the twentieth century, the region was noted for its exports of Vin de Constance a sweet dessert wine. Many years ago the trade was crippled by the arrival in the Cape of a parasite that attacked the vines.

In 1661, during the Dutch conquest of Sumatra, Sheik Abdurachman Matebe Shah and his companion Sheikh Mahmoud were exiled to Constantia by the Dutch. Sheik Abdurachman is regarded as one of the three people that first brought Islam to South Africa. The kramat at Klein Constantia is built on the site that Sheik Abdurachman is thought to have died in 1681 or 1682.

About 220 slaves worked over a period of 150 years on the land planted with vineyards, fruit and olive trees at the time of Van der Stel. A labour shortage after emancipation indicates that slaves moved away from the farms where they worked, but possibly stayed in the area. From the mid-1800s to the 1960s, Constantia remained a rural area of wine estates in which African and coloured residents constituted the majority. They were farmers, farm workers, domestics and fruit and flower sellers and lived in the areas of Strawberry Lane, Sillery Road, Spaanschemat River Road and Ladies Mile Road. In 1961 Constantia was zoned as a White Group Area under the Group Areas Act. In the late 1960s inhabitants classified as coloured or African were forcibly removed to areas in the Cape Flats like Mitchell's Plain, Manenberg and Lotus River. On Heritage Day 2009, a plaque remembering the Strawberry Lane community was unveiled by Cape Town's mayor Dan Plato.

Mark Thatcher, the son of Margaret Thatcher, and Charles Spencer, 9th Earl Spencer, the brother of Princess Diana, both lived in Constantia. Mark's house is now owned by the Sahara Group. The historic Tarrystone House, once owned by Charles Spencer, 9th Earl Spencer was listed for sale at R80 million.

Wine
The area is a major tourist hub outside of the central city area. Constantia is a well-known wine-producing area and one of the oldest in the southern hemisphere. It is home to at least ten wine farms, eight of which are included in an official wine route. Numerous operators offer tours of the Constantia wine route where visitors can take part in wine tastings at the farms. In addition to wine, many Constantia estates also include fine dining restaurants offering both local and international fare.
Many of the homesteads along the wine route display Baroque and Cape Dutch architectural styles.

Education 
Schools
 Norman Henshilwood High School
 American International School of Cape Town
 Herzlia Constantia
 Constantia Primary School
 Constantia Waldorf School
 Reddam House Constantia
 The Cape Academy of Maths, Science and Technology

Coat of arms
The Constantia Valley Local Council, which existed from the mid-1980s to the mid-1990s, registered a coat of arms at the Bureau of Heraldry in October 1992.

The arms were : Argent, an eagle displayed Sable, charged on the breast with an hour glass in fess Or; a chief nowy gabled Gules. The crest was a silver demi-stag with golden antlers and black wings emerging from a red mural crown.  The motto was Terra hereditas nostra.

References

External links

Constantia Valley

Suburbs of Cape Town
Wine regions of South Africa
1684 establishments in the Dutch Empire